Anne Ellis (1875 - 1938) was an American author and local official who wrote two memoirs chronicling her life in Colorado coal mining camps and her struggles with asthma including at sanitoriums. The University of Colorado awarded her an honorary degree and has a collection of her papers.

She covered subjects including cooking for a telephone gang, sheep shearing, race relations, Native Americans, county politics, and equal rights conventions in her writing.

Her face is among those included in a tile mural at the Colorado Convention Center, which was created by Barbara Jo Revelle in 1989.   the Saguache County Museum in Saguache, Colorado had a display on her.

Selected publications
The Life of An Ordinary Woman (1929)
Plain Anne Ellis: More About the Life of an Ordinary Woman (1931)
Sunshine Preferred; The Philosophy of an Ordinary Woman (1934)<ref> 1984 reprint of 1934 work, with introduction</ref>

References

Further readingColorado Quarterly (Summer 1955) 
 New York Times (August 30, 1931 and August 19, 1934)
 New York Times Review of Books'' (September 29, 1929)

1875 births
1938 deaths
19th-century American women writers
20th-century American women writers
People from Colorado